All Quiet on the Western Front is a 2022 German-language epic anti-war film based on the 1929 novel of the same name by Erich Maria Remarque. It is the third film adaptation of the book, after the 1930 and 1979 versions. Directed by Edward Berger, it stars Felix Kammerer, Albrecht Schuch, Daniel Brühl, Sebastian Hülk, Aaron Hilmer, Edin Hasanovic, and Devid Striesow. 

Set during World War I, it follows the life of an idealistic young German soldier named Paul Bäumer. After enlisting in the German Army with his friends, Bäumer finds himself exposed to the realities of war, shattering his early hopes of becoming a hero as he does his best to survive. The film adds a parallel storyline not found in the book, which follows the armistice negotiations to end the war.

All Quiet on the Western Front premiered at the Toronto International Film Festival on September 12, 2022, and was released to streaming on Netflix on October 28. The film received positive reviews from critics, with praise directed towards its tone and faithfulness to the source material's anti-war message. It received a leading 14 nominations at the 76th British Academy Film Awards (winning seven, including Best Film) and nine at the 95th Academy Awards, including Best Picture, and won four: Best International Feature, Best Cinematography, Best Original Score, and Best Production Design. The four wins tied All Quiet on the Western Front with Fanny and Alexander (1982), Crouching Tiger, Hidden Dragon (2000), and Parasite (2019) as the most-awarded foreign language film in the Oscars' history.

Plot
In 1917, three years into World War I, 17-year-old Paul Bäumer enlists in the Imperial German Army alongside friends Albert Kropp, Franz Müller, and Ludwig Behm. They listen to a patriotic speech by a school official and unknowingly receive uniforms from soldiers killed in a previous battle. After they are deployed in Northern France near La Malmaison, they are befriended by Stanislaus "Kat" Katczinsky, an older soldier. Their romantic view of the war is shattered by the realities of trench warfare on the Western Front, and Ludwig is killed by artillery on the first night.

On November 7, 1918, German official Matthias Erzberger, weary of mounting losses, meets with German High Command to persuade them to begin armistice talks with the Allied powers. Meanwhile, Paul and Kat steal a goose from a farm to share with Albert, Franz, and another veteran, Tjaden Stackfleet, with whom they have grown close behind the front in Champagne. Kat, who is illiterate, gets Paul to read him a letter from his wife and worries that he will be unable to reintegrate into peacetime society. Franz spends the night having sex with a French woman and brings back her scarf as a souvenir.

On November 9, Erzberger and the German delegation board a train bound for the Forest of Compiègne to negotiate a ceasefire. Paul and his friends go on a mission to find 60 missing recruits sent to reinforce their unit and discover that they were killed by gas after taking off their masks too soon. General Friedrichs, who opposes the armistice talks, orders an attack before French reinforcements arrive. That night, Erzberger's delegation reaches the Forest of Compiègne, and Paul's regiment is sent to the front to prepare to attack the French lines.

On November 10, Supreme Allied Commander Ferdinand Foch gives the Germans 72 hours to accept the non-negotiable Allied terms. Meanwhile, the German attack takes the French front line after hand-to-hand fighting but is routed by a combined arms counterattack, in which the French use Saint-Chamond tanks to overcome German defenses. Franz is separated from the group, and Albert dies trying to surrender. Trapped in a crater in no man's land with a French soldier, Paul stabs him and watches him die slowly, becoming remorseful and asking for forgiveness from his dead body. 

Erzberger learns of Kaiser Wilhelm II's abdication and receives instructions from field marshal Paul von Hindenburg to accept the Allied terms. Paul returns to his unit and sees them celebrating the war's imminent end. He finds a wounded Tjaden, who gives him Franz's scarf. Paul and Kat bring him food, but Tjaden, distraught at being crippled, fatally stabs himself in the throat with the fork they brought him.

On November 11, Erzberger's delegation signs an armistice set to take effect at 11:00 AM. After learning of the ceasefire, Paul and Kat steal from the farm one last time, but Kat is shot by the farmer's son in the liver and dies before arriving at an infirmary. Friedrichs, who wants to end the war with a German victory, orders an attack to start at 10:45 AM. Paul kills as many French soldiers as he can before being speared from behind by a bayonet seconds before 11:00 AM. Paul stumbles out into the trenches and marvels at the end of conflict as he dies from his wound. 

A short time later, a newly arrived German recruit that Paul had saved in the combat finds Paul's mud-caked body and picks up Franz's scarf, but not the dog tag that acts as the identifier for all soldiers in the war. As a result, Paul's death is not recorded.

Cast
 Felix Kammerer as Paul Bäumer
 Albrecht Schuch as Stanislaus "Kat" Katczinsky
  as Albert Kropp
 Moritz Klaus as Franz Müller
  as Ludwig Behm
  as Tjaden Stackfleet
 Daniel Brühl as Matthias Erzberger
 Thibault de Montalembert as General Ferdinand Foch
 Devid Striesow as General Friedrichs
  as Lieutenant Hoppe
  as Major Von Brixdorf

Production 

The film was announced in February 2020 with Edward Berger directing and Daniel Brühl as part of the ensemble cast. Principal photography began on 9 March 2021 in Prague, Czech Republic, and lasted 55 days. The film cost $20 million.

Release
All Quiet on the Western Front premiered at the 47th Toronto International Film Festival on September 12, 2022. It played exclusively at the Paris Theater in New York on October 7 before expanding to other theatres from October 14. It launched on Netflix, which acquired distribution rights prior to production, worldwide on October 28. From its release on Netflix to March 3, 2023, the film logged over 150 million hours viewed worldwide. Viewership tripled after the film's Oscar and BAFTA nominations, and was on the global Top 10 Non-English Film list for 14 weeks and in the Top 10 Films in 91 countries.

A making-of documentary called Making All Quiet on the Western Front was released on Netflix globally on February 20, 2023. A Collector's Edition Blu-ray release is scheduled for March 28, 2023, in the United States and April 24, 2023, in the United Kingdom.

Reception

Critical reception
 

Ben Kenigsberg, writing for The New York Times, found the film to be less impressive than the 1930 version, but appreciated the pounding soundtrack. He also praised the addition of a parallel plot tracking the armistice, even if it diverged from the first person narrative of the novel. He found the tweaked fate of the characters to be narratively powerful. Jamelle Bouie in The New York Times said the 2022 version missed the essence of the novel, which is not just antiwar, but also portrays the alienation and terrible toll even on those who come home. "Remarque is not as interested in the war and geopolitics as he is in the war as human absurdity made manifest." In a sequence of the 1930 film, omitted from the 2022 film, Paul comes home on leave and can't relate to former teachers and other adults. "You still think it's beautiful and sweet to die for your country, don't you?" says Paul. "The first bombardment taught us better." According to Bouie, "The inclusion of this political subplot and the exclusion of Paul's return home transforms All Quiet on the Western Front from a psychological examination of the soldier's experience and a condemnation of war into a much simpler story of virtuous soldiers and cynical leaders who betrayed them."

Mark Kermode says that, although it is on Netflix, there is an excellent reason to see it in cinemas because it is "visually very, very impressive, overwhelming, and gruelling." "It is harrowing of course ... and it should be." Cultural historian Bethany Wyatt makes a case for its being the "finest First World War film to date". She claims that it "is faithful to the spirit of Remarque's novel". Wyatt says "it is difficult to match the power of the 1930 All Quiet on the Western Fronts conclusion," ... "but the 2022 adaptation succeeds in crafting its own elegy for the men who did not return home."

Many German critics praised the action sequences but found fault with the film's considerable deviations from the book, which is required reading in many German schools. As Britain's New Statesman summarised, "...in Germany, it is seen as shallow, cynical and 'horny for Oscars. Hubert Wetzel, writing in Süddeutsche Zeitung, criticized the film's alterations to the book stating that "you have to ask yourself whether director Berger has even read Remarque's novel". He also criticizes that Berger added characters at will, omitted central characters and scenes, and changed the ending so that the title and content no longer had any connection to each other. The film also received negative reviews from Frankfurter Allgemeine Zeitung. Military historian Sönke Neitzel praised the battle scenes as being more historically accurate than the previous adaptations but criticized the film for depicting soldiers being shot to prevent desertion, as only 48 soldiers had been executed during the war.

Accolades

See also
 All Quiet on the Western Front (1930 film) and All Quiet on the Western Front (1979 film)
 List of submissions to the 95th Academy Awards for Best International Feature Film

References

External links 
 
 
 
 
 Official screenplay

All Quiet on the Western Front
2022 films
2022 drama films
2020s war films
2020s German films
2020s German-language films
Anti-war films about World War I
Best Foreign Language Film BAFTA Award winners
English-language Netflix original films
Films based on German novels
Films set in 1917
Films set in 1918
German World War I films
German drama films
German-language Netflix original films
Remakes of American films
Best Film BAFTA Award winners
BAFTA winners (films)
Films shot in Prague
Films whose cinematographer won the Best Cinematography Academy Award
Best Foreign Language Film Academy Award winners
Films whose art director won the Best Art Direction Academy Award
Films that won the Best Original Score Academy Award